Djimtan Yatamadji (born 16 February 1968) is a Chadian football manager, currently managing Chad.

Managerial career
In 2019, Yatamadji managed Chad during the country's 2020 African Nations Championship qualification campaign. In October 2020, whilst managing LINAFOOT club Foullah Edifice, Yatamadji was re-appointed manager of Chad.

References

Living people
Chadian football managers
Chad national football team managers
1968 births